The Sri Lankan presidential line of succession is the order in which persons may become or act as the President of Sri Lanka upon the incapacity, resignation or death of an incumbent President.

Constitutional procedure
The first of three paragraphs that make up Article 40 of the  Constitution states that:

Until parliament select a new president the following order is applied for line of succession to act as President of Sri Lanka

Current order 
The current presidential line of succession, as specified by the constitution is:

List of Acting Presidents

References

Government of Sri Lanka